Pigeon's Ford is a hamlet in the  community of Llangrannog, Ceredigion, Wales, which is 71.8 miles (115.5 km) from Cardiff and 189.9 miles (305.5 km) from London. Rhydcolomennod is represented in the Senedd by Elin Jones (Plaid Cymru) and is part of the Ceredigion constituency in the House of Commons.

References

See also
List of localities in Wales by population 

Villages in Ceredigion